Sveti Jakov   is a village in Croatia on the island of Lošinj. It is connected by the Croatian D100 highway.

Populated places in Primorje-Gorski Kotar County
Lošinj